New Forest and Christchurch was a county constituency in Hampshire which elected one Member of Parliament (MP) to the House of Commons of the Parliament of the United Kingdom. It was created for the 1918 general election, partially replacing the previous New Forest constituency, and was abolished for the 1950 general election, when it was partially replaced by a recreated New Forest constituency.

Boundaries
The Boroughs of Christchurch, Lymington, and Romsey, and the Rural Districts of Christchurch, Fordingbridge, Lymington, New Forest, Ringwood, and Romsey.

Members of Parliament

Election results

Elections in the 1910s

Elections in the 1920s

Elections in the 1930s 

General Election 1939–40:
Another General Election was required to take place before the end of 1940. The political parties had been making preparations for an election to take place and by the Autumn of 1939, the following candidates had been selected; 
Conservative: John Mills
Liberal: H J Dey
Labour: RE Gray

Elections in the 1940s

References 

 

Parliamentary constituencies in Hampshire (historic)
Constituencies of the Parliament of the United Kingdom established in 1918
Constituencies of the Parliament of the United Kingdom disestablished in 1950
Politics of Christchurch, Dorset
New Forest District